Tudor Hall in Wood Street, Chipping Barnet, is the original site of Queen Elizabeth's School, Barnet. It was built around 1577 following the granting of a charter for the school by Queen Elizabeth I in 1573 and is a grade II listed building with Historic England.

References

External links

 Queen Elizabeth School Archives: Tudor Hall

Grade II listed buildings in the London Borough of Barnet
Former school buildings in the United Kingdom
Wood Street, Chipping Barnet
Elizabethan architecture